According to some linguistics theories, a stative verb is a verb that describes a state of being, in contrast to a dynamic verb, which describes an action. The difference can be categorized by saying that stative verbs describe situations that are static or unchanging throughout their entire duration, whereas dynamic verbs describe processes that entail change over time. Many languages distinguish between these two types in terms of how they can be used grammatically.

Contrast to dynamic 
Some languages use the same verbs for dynamic and stative situations, and others use different (but often related) verbs with some kind of qualifiers to distinguish between them. Some verbs may act as either stative or dynamic. A phrase like "he plays the piano" may be either stative or dynamic, according to the context. When, in a given context, the verb "play" relates to a state (an interest or a profession), he could be an amateur who enjoys music or a professional pianist. The dynamic interpretation emerges from a specific context in the case "play" describes an action, "what does he do on Friday evening? He plays the piano".

The distinction between stative and dynamic verbs can be correlated with:

 the distinction between intransitive and transitive
 the grammatical case used with a prepositional phrase associated with the verb
 the possibility of using the progressive aspect with the verb
 morphological markers

Grammatical case 
Some languages make distinctions between stative and dynamic verbs in sentences. In German, for instance, several prepositions (Wechselpräpositionen – "changing prepositions") take different noun cases when they accompany stative and dynamic verbs. For stative verbs, the corresponding preposition takes the dative case, whereas for dynamic verbs, the preposition takes the accusative case. For example:
 Ich lege den Stift auf den Tisch. (I lay the pen on(to) the table.) – Den here is the masculine definite article in accusative case. [lege – infinitive: legen]
BUT
 Der Stift liegt auf dem Tisch. (The pen lies on the table.) – Dem here is masculine definite article in dative case. [liegt – infinitive: liegen]

The same scheme also applies with stative and dynamic verbs in general, i.e. when the verb is stative (albeit the dynamic counterpart is non-existent), the preposition will always take dative, and vice versa.
 Ich bin in der Schule. (I am at school. – literally I am in the school.) – Der here is the feminine definite article in dative case, since the verb bin (infinitive: sein – to be) is a stative verb.
 Ich gehe in die Schule. (I go to school. – literally I go in the school.) – Die here is the feminine definite article in accusative case, since the verb gehe (infinitive: gehen – to go) is a dynamic verb.
BUT
Ich gehe zur Schule. [zur = zu + der] (I go to school. – literally I go to the school.) – Der here is the feminine definite article in dative case. Note that zu is not a Wechselpräposition and always takes dative case.
  bist du? – Im Kino. [im = in + dem] (Where are you? – In the cinema.) – Dem here is the neuter definite article in dative case. [bist – infinitive: sein]
  gehst du? – Ins Kino. [ins = in + das] (Where are you going? – To the cinema.) – Das here is the neuter definite article in accusative case. [gehst – infinitive: gehen]

Progressive aspect 
In English and many other languages, stative and dynamic verbs differ in whether or not they can use the progressive aspect. Dynamic verbs such as "go" can be used in the progressive (I am going to school) whereas stative verbs such as "know" cannot (*I am knowing the answer). A verb that has both dynamic and stative uses cannot normally be used in the progressive when a stative meaning is intended: e.g. one cannot normally say, idiomatically, "Every morning, I am going to school".  In other languages, statives can be used in the progressive as well: in Korean, for example, the sentence 미나가 인호를 사랑하고 있다 (Mina is loving Inho) is perfectly valid.

Morphological markers 
In some languages, stative and dynamic verbs will use entirely different morphological markers on the verbs themselves. For example, in the Mantauran dialect of Rukai, an indigenous language of Taiwan, the two types of verbs take different prefixes in their finite forms, with dynamic verbs taking o- and stative verbs taking ma-. Thus, the dynamic verb "jump" is o-coroko in the active voice, while the stative verb "love" is ma-ðalamə. This sort of marking is characteristic of other Formosan languages as well.

Difference from inchoative
In English, a verb that expresses a state can also express the entrance into a state. This is called inchoative aspect. The simple past is sometimes inchoative. For example, the present-tense verb in the sentence "He understands his friend" is stative, while the past-tense verb in the sentence "Suddenly he understood what she said" is inchoative, because it means "He understood henceforth". On the other hand, the past-tense verb in "At one time, he understood her" is stative.

The only way the difference between stative and inchoative can be expressed in English is through the use of modifiers, as in the above examples ("suddenly" and "at one time").

Likewise, in ancient Greek, a verb that expresses a state (e.g., ebasíleuon "I was king") may use the aorist to express entrance into the state (e.g., ebasíleusa "I became king"). But the aorist can also simply express the state as a whole, with no focus on the beginning of the state (eíkosi étē ebasíleusa "I ruled for twenty years").

Formal definitions 
In some theories of formal semantics, including David Dowty's, stative verbs have a logical form that is the lambda expression

Apart from Dowty, Z. Vendler and C. S. Smith have also written influential work on aspectual classification of verbs.

English

Dowty's analysis 
Dowty gives several tests to decide whether an English verb is stative. They are as follows:

 Statives do not occur in the progressive:
 John is running. (non-stative)
 *John is knowing the answer.
 They cannot be complements of "force":
 I forced John to run.
 *I forced John to know the answer.
 They do not occur as imperatives, except when used in an inchoative manner.
 Run!
 *Know the answer!
 Know thyself! (inchoative, not stative; archaic)
 They cannot appear in the pseudo-cleft construction:
 What John did was run.
 *What John did was know the answer.

Categories

Stative verbs are often divided into sub-categories, based on their semantics or syntax.

Semantic divisions mainly involve verbs that express someone's state of mind, or something's properties (of course, things can also be expressed via other language mechanisms as well, particularly adjectives). The precise categories vary by linguist. Huddleston and Pullum, for example, divide stative verbs into the following semantic categories: verbs of perception and sensation (see, hear), verbs of hurting (ache, itch), stance verbs (stand, sit), and verbs of cognition, emotion, and sensation (believe, regret). Novakov, meanwhile, uses the slightly different categories: verbs denoting sensations (feel, hear), verbs denoting reasoning and mental attitude (believe, understand), verbs denoting positions/stance (lie, surround), and verbs denoting relations (resemble, contain).

Syntactic divisions involve the types of clause structures in which a verb may be used. In the following examples, an asterisk (*) indicates that the sentence is ungrammatical:

 John believes that Fido is a dog.
 *John believes on Fido barking.
 *John believes Fido to bark.

 *Joan depends that Fido is a dog.
 Joan depends on Fido barking.
 *Joan depends Fido to bark.

 Jim loathes that Fido is a dog.
 *Jim loathes on Fido barking.
 *Jim loathes Fido to bark.

See also 
 Lexical aspect
 Copula

References 

Verb types
Syntax–semantics interface